Siavash Saffari  is an Iranian political scientist and associate professor of West Asian Studies at Seoul National University. He is known for his works on Iranian intellectual history.

Books
 Beyond Shariati: Modernity, Cosmopolitanism, and Islam in Iranian Political Thought, Cambridge University Press 2017 
 Unsettling Colonial Modernity in Islamicate Contexts, co-edited with Roxana Akhbari, Kara Abdolmaleki, and Evelyn Hamdon, Cambridge Scholars Publishing, 2017

References

External links
Personal website

Living people
Iranian political scientists
Academic staff of Seoul National University
University of Alberta alumni
McMaster University alumni
Simon Fraser University alumni
Canadian political scientists
Year of birth missing (living people)